Anișoara Sorohan (later Minea, born 9 February 1963) is a retired Romanian rower. Competing in quadruple sculls she won two Olympic and two world championship medals between 1984 and 1988.

References

External links
 

1963 births
Living people
Romanian female rowers
People from Târgu Frumos
Rowers at the 1984 Summer Olympics
Rowers at the 1988 Summer Olympics
Olympic gold medalists for Romania
Olympic bronze medalists for Romania
Olympic medalists in rowing
World Rowing Championships medalists for Romania
Medalists at the 1988 Summer Olympics
Medalists at the 1984 Summer Olympics